Concentration is a music album by artists Machines of Loving Grace which was released in 1993. The song "Butterfly Wings" achieved moderate success and appeared on the soundtrack to the film Punisher: War Zone, as well as the TV Series Due South.

Track listing
All tracks by Machines of Loving Grace

 "Perfect Tan (Bikini Atoll)"  – 3:21
 "Butterfly Wings"  – 3:38
 "Lilith/Eve"  – 3:59
 "Albert Speer"  – 4:38
 "Limiter"  – 4:43
 "If I Should Explode"  – 5:08
 "Shake"  – 4:03
 "Cheap"  – 3:38
 "Acceleration"  – 3:22
 "Ancestor Cult"  – 3:46
 "Content?"  – 4:04
 "Trigger for Happiness" (over the 3/4 minutes of the song's duration, silence and sporadic samples follow for the rest of the track's total length)  – 30:12

Trivia 

 After roughly three to four minutes, the song trigger for happiness is followed largely by silence with the exception of a "don't fool yourself" sample being played every several minutes. The tracks remaining run time was intended to "fool" the listener into thinking a hidden track would play at some point, but this never occurs.

Personnel 
Betty Anderson – Vocals (background)
Steve Balcom – Executive Producer
Scott Benzel – Vocals
Jenny Bernhardt – Strings
Jim Brady – Assistant Engineer
Pat Dillon – Model
Jay Faires – Executive Producer
Mike Fisher – Arranger, Cello, Keyboards, String Arrangements, *Assistant Engineer
Ilona Vukovic Gay – Strings
Jim Goodwin – Mixing, Mixing Assistant, Assistant Mastering Engineer
Karen Goulding – Strings
Michael Hooker – Assistant Engineer
Dean Karr – Artwork, Photography, Sculpture
Brad Kemp – Drums
Stuart Kupers – Bass, Guitar
Barbara Mitchell – Model
Roli Mosimann – Producer, Mixing
Dino Paredes – Artwork, Art Direction, Sculpture
Jim Roche – Spoken Word
Mike Russell – Strings
Alan Smith – Strings
Andrew Stewart – Bass
Howie Weinberg – Mastering

References

Machines of Loving Grace albums
1993 albums
Albums produced by Roli Mosimann